The minor snake-eyed skink (Ablepharus grayanus) is a species of skink that can be found in India, Iran, Pakistan, Afghanistan, the mountain regions of the eastern former Soviet central Asia, and possibly Kyrgyzstan.

Etymology
The specific name, grayanus, is in honor of British herpetologist John Edward Gray.

References

Further reading
Boulenger GA (1887). Catalogue of the Lizards in the British Museum (Natural  History). Second Edition. Volume III. Lacertidæ, Gerrhosauridæ, Scincidæ, Anelytropidæ, Dibamidæ, Chamæleontidæ. London: Trustees of the British Museum (Natural History). (Taylor and Francis, printers). xii + 575 pp. + Plates I-XL. (Ablepharus grayanus, new combination, p. 352).
Stoliczka F (1872).  "Notes on the Reptilian and Amphibian Fauna of Kachh". Proc. Asiatic Soc. Bengal 1872: 71–85. (Blepharosteres grayanus, new species, pp. 74–75).

External links

Ablepharus
Reptiles described in 1872
Reptiles of Central Asia
Taxa named by Ferdinand Stoliczka
Reptiles of South Asia